The Electoral district of Ballarat West (initially spelt Ballaarat West) was an electoral district of the Victorian Legislative Assembly in Australia. It existed from 1859–1927 and from 1992–2014. 

The original seat was created for the second election to the Legislative Assembly in 1859. In 1927, it was merged with Ballaarat East to form a single Ballaarat electorate.

Its second implementation occurred in 1992, when it replaced Ballarat North. Unlike Ballarat East, which had a rural character, Ballarat West was mostly urban, and included much of Ballarat proper and its southern and western suburbs.

The seat was replaced by Wendouree in 2014.

Members for Ballarat West
Three members from 1877 to 1889.

Election results

See also
 Parliaments of the Australian states and territories
 List of members of the Victorian Legislative Assembly

References

Parliament of Victoria, Re-member

External links
Electorate profile: Ballarat West District, Victorian Electoral Commission

Former electoral districts of Victoria (Australia)
Ballarat
1859 establishments in Australia
1992 establishments in Australia
1927 disestablishments in Australia
2014 disestablishments in Australia